Maximilian Marterer (born 15 June 1995) is a German tennis player. He has a career high ATP singles ranking of world No. 45, achieved in August 2018.

Professional career

2015: ATP debut
Marterer made his ATP main draw debut at the MercedesCup in Stuttgart where he was given a wildcard into the singles event.

2016: Maiden Challenger title 
Marterer won his first ATP Challenger Tour singles title at the Morocco Tennis Tour in Meknes.

2017: Top 100 debut
Marterer entered the world's top 100 for the first time, becoming world No. 100 on 16 October 2017.

2018: First ATP semifinal and top 50 

At the Australian Open, Marterer won his first ATP main draw match after losing 14 first round matches in a row. He defeated compatriot Cedrik-Marcel Stebe in straight sets. In the second round, he upset former top-10 player Fernando Verdasco in a five-setter before losing to Tennys Sandgren in the next round.

At the Sofia Open, he reached his first ATP quarterfinal, where he lost to eventual champion Mirza Bašić in three sets. He reached his first ATP semifinal at the BMW Open in Munich.

At the French Open, he defeated American Ryan Harrison in straight sets in the first round to set up a second round clash against seeded teenager Denis Shapovalov. For both players it was their first appearance at the French Open, but it was Marterer who triumphed in four sets to reach the third round for the second consecutive Grand Slam. His run extended to the fourth round with a straight sets win over Jürgen Zopp. There, he lost to world No. 1 Rafael Nadal.

2021: Back to top 200
Ranked outside the top 200 at No. 215, he qualified for the 2021 French Open but lost to Filip Krajinovic in the first round.

Ranked World No. 209, he qualified for the main draw at the 2021 US Open after two years of absence but lost also in the first round to Steve Johnson in a tight four sets match.

2022: Back to top 150
He qualified for two Grand Slams at the 2022 Australian Open, after 2 years of absence, and the 2022 Wimbledon Championships after 3 years of absence at the All England Club where he won his first round match at this Major defeating Aljaž Bedene before losing to 23rd seed Frances Tiafoe. He also qualified for the last Major of the year at the US Open.

Performance timelines

Singles 
''Current through the 2023 Indian Wells Masters.

ATP Challenger and ITF Futures finals

Singles: 22 (13–9)

Doubles: 10 (7–3)

Junior Grand Slam finals

Doubles: 1 (1 runner-up)

Record against top 10 players
Marterer's match record against those who have been ranked in the top 10, with players who have been No. 1 in boldface. Only ATP Tour main draw matches are considered. 

  Hubert Hurkacz 1–0
  Gaël Monfils 1–0
  Denis Shapovalov 1–0
  Fernando Verdasco 1–0
  Taylor Fritz 1–1
  Diego Schwartzman 1–1
  Tomáš Berdych 0–1
  Marin Čilić 0–1
  Grigor Dimitrov 0–1
  Fabio Fognini 0–1
  Daniil Medvedev 0–1
  Rafael Nadal 0–1
  Kei Nishikori 0–1
  Cameron Norrie 0–1
  Lucas Pouille 0–1
  Stefanos Tsitsipas 0–1
  Gilles Simon 0–2
  Dominic Thiem 0–2

 *

References

External links
 
 
 

1995 births
Living people
German male tennis players
Sportspeople from Nuremberg
People from Fürth (district)
Sportspeople from Middle Franconia
Tennis people from Bavaria
21st-century German people